Malaysia competed in the 2013 Southeast Asian Games held in Naypyidaw, the capital of Myanmar, as well as in two other main cities, Yangon and Mandalay. Malaysia was selected the host nation for the 2017 edition.

Medallists

| style="text-align:left; width:78%; vertical-align:top;"|

Medal summary

Medal by sport

Medal by Date

Multiple Medalists

Aquatics

Diving

Men

Women

Swimming

Men

Women

Athletics

Men
Track and road events

Field events

Women
Track and road events

Field events

Basketball

Men's tournament
All times are Myanmar Standard Time (UTC+06:30).

Note: Vietnam, Laos, Brunei and Timor-Leste did not participate in the men's competition.

|}

Women's tournament
All times are Myanmar Standard Time (UTC+06:30).

|}

Football

Men's tournament
Group A
On 6 November, Philippines which was originally drawn in Group A, withdrew from the SEA Games men's football competition.

Semifinal

Bronze medal match

Women's tournament
Group B
On 22 November, Timor-Leste which was originally drawn in Group B, withdrew from the SEA Games women's football competition.

Semifinal

Bronze medal match

Indoor volleyball

Men's tournament
Group A

|}

|}

Fifth and sixth place match

|}

Women's tournament
Group stage

|}

|}

References

External links
 Laporan Tahunan dan Penyata Kewangan Majlis Sukan Negara bagi Tahun 2013 

2013